This is a list of tennis players who have represented the Australia Davis Cup team in an official Davis Cup match since 1923. It also includes players who competed for the Australasia Davis Cup team, a combined side featuring both Australians and New Zealanders from 1905 (as Australia assumed all records).
Players still active are in bold.

Players

Notes

References

 Davis Cup
Australia